Charles M. McFatridge (August 14, 1871 – January 1, 1949) was an American politician from the state of Iowa.

McFatridge was born in Monroe County, Iowa, in 1871. He served as a Democrat for one term in the Iowa House of Representatives from January 11, 1937, to January 8, 1939. McFatridge died in Moravia, Appanoose County, Iowa in 1949. He was interred in Hillcrest Cemetery in Moravia, Iowa.

References

1871 births
1949 deaths
20th-century American politicians
Democratic Party members of the Iowa House of Representatives
People from Appanoose County, Iowa
People from Monroe County, Iowa